"Keep It Mello" is a song by American electronic music producer and DJ Marshmello featuring Mexican-Canadian rapper Omar LinX, it was released on January 8, 2016, as lead single from Marshmello's debut studio album Joytime.

Composition
The song is written in the key of C♭ Minor, with a tempo of 142 beats per minute.

Music video
An accompanying music video was released on April 8, 2016. The video cameoed by Dillon Francis, Mija, Getter, Ookay, and Borgore. According to a description by staffs of Billboard, it features as "traces its cartoonish protagonist and LinX on a journey from the convenience store to a star-studded backyard party." And marks "by marshmallow pong games and toasts".

Charts

Weekly charts

Year-end charts

Certifications

References

2016 songs
2016 singles
Marshmello songs